Shangcheng may refer to:

Shangcheng County (商城县), in Xinyang, Henan, China
Shangcheng District (上城区), in Hangzhou, Zhejiang, China
Shangcheng, Cheng'an County (商城镇), in Hebei, China

See also
 Shangchen, archaeological site in Shaanxi, China
 Shancheng (disambiguation)